The 45th Air Force Group is a unit of the Spanish Air and Space Force responsible for air transportation of the Spanish royal family, the Prime Minister and high-ranking government officials. In addition, it also transports personnel and material on international missions of the Spanish Armed Forces.

Fleet overview 
Currently, the 45th Group fleet is composed by 2 customized Airbus A310 in service since 2003 and 5 Dassault Falcon 900 in service since 2004. Since 2021, the Group also operates 3 Airbus A330 MRTT.

Helicopters 
Currently, the VIP transport by helicopter is not responsibility of the 45th Air Force Group but of the 402th Air Force Squadron within the 48th Wing.

See also
 Air transports of heads of state and government

References

External links 
45 Grupo de Fuerzas Aéreas Website
Tour of Spanish Air Force A310

Air force units and formations of Spain